Damian Drăghici (born 31 March 1970, Bucharest) is a Romanian musician of  Romani origin.

He is a  musician, best known as the leadear of the Damian and Brothers band and  a nai player and is a noted exponent of this instrument in the world of jazz.

Early life

Drăghici was born in Bucharest to a family of lăutari whose distinguished musical heritage dates back at least seven generations. He started to play lăutărească music in the family and tried an array of instruments before settling on the nai at the age of ten.

Musical career

USA Berklee College of Music
In 1996, Drăghici auditioned for faculty members visiting Athens from the Berklee College of Music in Boston
It offered him a full scholarship and he began to study with George Garzone,  Jerry Bergonzi and Hal Crook.

Los Angeles

Following graduation from college with a Magna Cum Laude majoring in Jazz Performance, he relocated to Los Angeles where he started working with major Hollywood film composers, music producers and some of the best musicians in the world.  He worked on his first major EMI release, Damian's Fire with the London Symphony Orchestra and highly acclaimed musicians such as Vinnie Colaiuta, Dave Weckl, Abraham Laboriel, Neil Stubenhaus, Jimmy Johnson (bassist), John Robinson (drummer), Mike Miller (guitarist), Ramon Stagnaro, Luis Conte and Oscar Castro Neves.

Tours

In 2004, Drăghici joined James Brown, Joe Cocker, reggae star Shaggy, Cyndi Lauper, Zucchero, Gipsy Kings, Roger Hodgson (Supertramp) and The Pointer Sisters for one of Europe's most esteemed musical events, the Night of the Proms tour.

On 12 November 2010, he showcased his ability to perform some of the most challenging jazz tunes on pan-flute live on stage in a Bucharest concert together with clarinet player Eddie Daniels and vocalist Diane Schuur. At the 8 May 2011 Classical Meets Jazz event Drăghici and violinist Nigel Kennedy performed together in the Palace Square. The repertoire included classical, jazz and Romanian folk music. This was his last public performance as he announced his withdrawal from the music scene.

Damian & Brothers project

In 2006 Drăghici decided to come back to his roots with a new  concept and a new group, “his gypsy brothers” as he called them. One of the purposes of “Damian & Brothers, was to change the negative perception and stereotypes of the Romani minority through their music. The impact and the huge popularity achieved during the three-year period of the project are a legacy of their common effort.

Member of the European Parliament
In the 2014 European Parliament election, he was one of two Roma candidates elected, along with Soraya Post. Drăghici was an MEP for the Romanian Social Democrats during his tenure as an MEP.

References

See also
 List of Berklee College of Music alumni

1970 births
Romani musicians
Romanian musicians
Romanian Romani people
Lăutari and lăutărească music
Romani politicians
Members of the Senate of Romania
National Union for the Progress of Romania politicians
Living people
Berklee College of Music alumni
MEPs for Romania 2014–2019
Extensive Music artists